Couple-ish is a Canadian LGBTQ+ web series starring Kaitlyn Alexander, Mercedes Morris, Sharon Belle and Nicholas Potter. They are joined by Premika Leo in the second season of the show. The series follows Dee Warson, a non-binary illustrator, who becomes entangled in the lie that they are in a common law partnership with their roommate, Rachel Mannt.

The series premiered on December 9, 2015 and concluded the first season on March 9, 2016.

The second season premiered on April 29, 2017 and concluded on September 17, 2017.

Series overview

Episodes

Season 1 (2015)

Season 2 (2017)

References

Couple-ish